Saint-Germain-des-Prés is a station on Line 4 of the Paris Métro. It serves the Saint-Germain-des-Prés neighbourhood on the Rive Gauche, in the 6th arrondissement. In 2013, the station was used by 4,498,265 passengers, making it the 101st busiest out of 302 on the Métro network.

Location
The station is located under Boulevard Saint-Germain not far from the intersection with Rue de Rennes and Rue Bonaparte.

History

The station was opened on 9 January 1910 as part of the connecting section of the line under the Seine between Châtelet and Raspail. It is named after Place Saint-Germain and the Abbey of Saint-Germain-des-Prés, dedicated on 23 December 558 by the son of Clovis, Childebert I (ruled 511–558), at the request of St. Germain, Bishop of Paris. Childebert died the same day and was buried in it. More than a thousand years later the remains of the philosopher René Descartes were also buried in it. The expression "des-Prés" refers to the Prés aux Clercs ("fields of the scholars") used for the erection of buildings to house the University of Paris.

The station was equipped with platform screen doors from February until May 2019, preparing it for the line's ongoing full automation.

Passenger services

Access
Each of the two exits from this station, located on either side of Boulevard Saint-Germain, just next to the church of the same name, is adorned with a Val d'Osne candelabra.

Station layout

Bus connections
The station is served by Lines 39, 63, 70, 86, 87, 95, 96 and the tourist line OpenTour of the RATP Bus Network and, at night, by lines N01, N02, N12 and N13 of the Noctilien network .

Nearby
The Abbey of Saint-Germain-des-Prés, the Café de Flore and Les Deux Magots are located nearby.

Gallery

References

Roland, Gérard (2003). Stations de métro. D’Abbesses à Wagram. Éditions Bonneton.

Paris Métro stations in the 6th arrondissement of Paris
Railway stations in France opened in 1910